The Scout and Guide movement in the Maldives is served by two organisations
 Maldives Girl Guide Association, member of the World Association of Girl Guides and Girl Scouts
 The Scout Association of Maldives, member of the World Organization of the Scout Movement

See also